Cioni is an Italian surname. Notable people with the surname include:

Dario Cioni (born 1974), Italian professional cyclist, currently riding for Team Sky
Gilles Cioni (born 1984), French footballer, currently playing for SC Bastia
Oreste Cioni (1913 – after 1966), Italian footballer and football manager
Renato Cioni (born 1929), Italian opera singer
Vittorio Cioni (1900–1981), Italian rower and Olympian

See also
12812 Cioni, main-belt asteroid

Italian-language surnames